Pierre Albertini (born 22 November 1944) was the mayor of Rouen, France between 2001 and 2008 and a former deputy to the National Assembly of France (1993–2007), both on behalf of the Union for French Democracy.

External links
 Blog
 CityMayors profile

1944 births
Living people
French people of Italian descent
People from Batna, Algeria
Pieds-Noirs
Union for French Democracy politicians
Democratic Convention (France) politicians
Mayors of places in Normandy
Deputies of the 10th National Assembly of the French Fifth Republic
Deputies of the 11th National Assembly of the French Fifth Republic
Deputies of the 12th National Assembly of the French Fifth Republic
University of Caen Normandy alumni
University of Rouen Normandy alumni